The Embassy of the Emirate of Bukhara in Orenburg is a culturally significant building in  Orenburg,  Orenburg Oblast, Russia. It is a registered historic monument with the Ministry of Culture of the Russian Federation. The house was built for the Emir of Bukhara.

The house dates to the late 19th century and is designed in neoclassical style with decorative Islamic motif, particularly around the windows. It served as a court for the Orenburg Governorate.

The three-story house is made of bricks and is rectangular in form.

References

Buildings and structures in Orenburg
Neoclassical architecture in Russia
Cultural heritage monuments in Orenburg
Objects of cultural heritage of Russia of regional significance
Tourist attractions in Orenburg Oblast